BODYARMOR is an American sports drink brand fully owned by The Coca-Cola Company.  Products launched under brand include: Sports, Lyte Sports, Edge Sports, and SportWater.

Mike Repole created the drink in 2011. In the summer of 2018, The Coca-Cola Company purchased a minority stake in the company to position BODYARMOR as a premium sports beverage above its own Powerade brand. The purchase by Coca-Cola made them the second largest shareholder. In November 2021, Coca-Cola acquired the remaining 85% stake of the company.

Flavors and variations 
BODYARMOR offers a wide variety of different flavors and variations for their beverages, including:

Sports 
 Blackout Berry
 Blue Raspberry
 Cherry Lime
 Fruit Punch
 Orange Mango
 Pineapple Coconut
 Strawberry Banana
 Strawberry Grape
 Tropical Punch
 Watermelon Strawberry

Lyte 
 Berry Punch
 Blueberry Pomegranate
 Dragonfruit Berry
 Kiwi Strawberry
 Orange Clementine
 Peach Mango
 Strawberry Banana Lyte
 Strawberry Lemonade
 Tropical Coconut

Edge 
 Blue Raspberry
 Grape
 Strawberry
 Tropical Punch

SportWater 
 Alkaline water with electrolytes

Discontinued 
 Berry Lemonade
 Cherry Citrus
 Grape
 Kiwi Apple
 Knockout Punch
 Lemon Lime
 Lemonade
 Mixed Berry
 Octagon Orange
 Pomegranate Acai Green Tea
 Raspberry Blueberry Goji
 Tropical Mandarin
 Cherry Berry Lyte
 Coconut Lyte
 Orange Citrus Lyte
 Watermelon Lyte
 Berry Blitz Edge
 Orange Frenzy Edge
 Power Punch Edge
 Strawberry Slam Edge
 Tropical Chaos Edge
 Watermelon Wave Edge

Product ingredients 
General ingredients for the beverage include: Filtered Water, Pure Cane Sugar, Coconut Water Concentrate, Citric Acid, Dipotassium Phosphate (Electrolyte), Vegetable Juice Concentrate (Color), Ascorbic Acid (Vitamin C), Magnesium Oxide (Electrolyte), Niacinamide (Vitamin B3), Calcium D-Pantothenate (Vitamin B5), alpha-Tocopheryl Acetate (Vitamin E), Zinc Oxide (Electrolyte), Pyridoxine Hydrochloride (Vitamin B6), Folic Acid (Vitamin B9), Vitamin A Palmitate (Vitamin A), Cyanocobalamin (Vitamin B12), and natural flavors.

Partnerships
BODYARMOR has partnered with Naomi Osaka, Baker Mayfield, Andrew Luck, Mike Trout, Rob Gronkowski, Klay Thompson, Skylar Diggins, Sydney Leroux, and Ryan Blaney.

In April 2015, BODYARMOR became the official sports drink of the Los Angeles Angels of Anaheim.

As part of their deal with Blaney, BODYARMOR is also a sponsor on the #12 car for Team Penske in the NASCAR Cup Series.

In 2018, BODYARMOR became the official sports drink brand of the Ultimate Fighting Championship, commensurate with the introduction of the "Knockout Punch" flavor. 

Later in 2018 with Coca-Cola's minority stake taken in the company, BODYARMOR became the official sports drink brand for the NCAA's national championship tournaments, including the men's and women's basketball tournaments starting in 2019.

In 2019, BODYARMOR became the official sports drink of Major League Soccer beginning with the 2020 MLS season.

Legal issues 
In 2012, Baltimore's Under Armour Inc. settled its trademark infringement lawsuit against California-based Body Armor Nutrition LLC. The suit claimed that BODYARMOR used variations of Under Armour's name and logo to sell its sports beverage products. Terms of the settlement have not been disclosed. The lawsuit had alleged that Body Armor's name, the “interlocking” logo on its sports drink bottles and use of the phrase “Protect + Restore,” infringe on Under Armour's trademarks.

References

Food production companies based in New York City
Drink companies of the United States
Sports drinks
Products introduced in 2011
Coca-Cola brands
2018 mergers and acquisitions